Newchapel is a civil parish in the barony of Iffa and Offa East, County Tipperary, Ireland.

References 

Civil parishes of Iffa and Offa East